Ilmar-Aleksander Talve (until 1936 Thalfeldt; 17 January 1919 Mga, Ingria – 21 April 2007 Turku) was an Estonian writer and ethnologist. He worked primarily in Sweden and Finland.

In 1943, he fled to Finland and there he joined with Finnish Infantry Regiment 200.

From 1946, he was a member of literary grouping Tuulisui.

Since 1959, he taught at the University of Turku and in 1986 became a professor emeritus.

Works
 short story "Ainult inimene". Vadstena: Orto, 1948
 novel "Maja lumes. Lund: Eesti Kirjanike Kooperatiiv, 1952.
 novel "Juhansoni reisid. Lund: Eesti Kirjanike Kooperatiiv, 1959
 novel "Maapagu. I-II. Lund: Eesti Kirjanike Kooperatiiv, 1988
 monograph "Eesti kultuurilugu: Keskaja algusest Eesti iseseisvuseni". Tartu: Ilmamaa, 2004

References

1919 births
2007 deaths
Estonian male novelists
Estonian male short story writers
Estonian ethnologists
People from Kirovsky District, Leningrad Oblast
Estonian military personnel
Estonian emigrants to Finland
Estonian expatriates in Sweden
Finnish military personnel of World War II